The men's freestyle 70 kilograms is a competition featured at the 2021 World Wrestling Championships, and was held in Oslo, Norway on 4 and 5 October.

This freestyle wrestling competition consists of a single-elimination tournament, with a repechage used to determine the winner of two bronze medals. The two finalists face off for gold and silver medals. Each wrestler who loses to one of the two finalists moves into the repechage, culminating in a pair of bronze medal matches featuring the semifinal losers each facing the remaining repechage opponent from their half of the bracket.

Results
Legend
F — Won by fall

Final

Top half

Bottom half

Repechage

Final standing

References

External links
Official website

Men's freestyle 70 kg